Blaise Pascal University, also known as Université Blaise Pascal, Clermont-Ferrand II or just Clermont-Ferrand II, was a public university with its main campus on  in Clermont-Ferrand, France, with satellite locations in other parts of the region of Auvergne, including Vichy, Moulins, Montluçon, and Aubière. On 1 January 2017, the university became a part of the University Clermont Auvergne.

History 

It was founded in 1854, as part of Clermont-Ferrand University.

The Blaise Pascal University was created by the division of the University of Clermont-Ferrand in two entities following a 1976 decree.

In 1987 it was named for mathematician, scientist, and philosopher Blaise Pascal, who was born in Clermont.

Mathias Bernard was elected in 2012 as president of the university.

However, both Clermont-Ferrand universities have announced their intention to merge. As of 2017, Clermont-Ferrand became a part of the University Clermont Auvergne.

Statistics 

For the 2013–2014 academic year, the university had an enrollment of 16,007 students, of which nearly 2,500 were foreign students. Additionally, it had 970 research professors between its multiple campuses. Students may choose from among 250 degrees and programs.

Courses 

It offers bachelor's, master, and doctorate degrees in Arts and Humanities, Engineering, Language and Cultural Studies, and Science and Technology. It also offers bachelor's or master's degrees in Business and Social Science.

See also
 University of Auvergne or University Clermont I

References

External links
Université Blaise-Pascal online (en francais) 

Educational institutions established in 1976
1976 establishments in France
Educational institutions disestablished in 2016
2016 disestablishments in France
Defunct universities and colleges in France
Universities in Auvergne-Rhône-Alpes